H. nepalensis may refer to:

 Haemaphysalis nepalensis, a hard tick
 Hamaspora nepalensis, a rust fungus
 Haplocosmia nepalensis, a true tarantula
 Haploporus nepalensis, a bracket fungus
 Hedera nepalensis, a perennial ivy
 Hemisodorcus nepalensis, a stag beetle
 Hepialiscus nepalensis, an Asian moth
 Hersilia nepalensis, a long-spinnered bark spider
 Heterometrus nepalensis, a giant forest scorpion
 Hexatoma nepalensis, a crane fly
 Himalmartensus nepalensis, a three-clawed spider
 Himalphalangium nepalensis, a daddy longlegs
 Hoplia nepalensis, a scarab beetle
 Hydrelia nepalensis, an Asian moth
 Hydrocotyle nepalensis, a perennial plant
 Hydroscapha nepalensis, a water beetle